Les Barricades Mystérieuses (The Mysterious Barricades) is a piece of music that François Couperin composed for harpsichord in 1717. It is the fifth piece in his "Ordre 6ème de clavecin" in B-flat major, from his second book of collected harpsichord pieces (Pièces de Clavecin). It is emblematic of the style brisé characteristic of French Baroque keyboard music.

Music
The work is in rondeau form, employing a variant of the traditional romanesca in the bass in quadruple time rather than the usual triple time.  In the view of Tom Service.

Title
Les Barricades Mystérieuses was originally published with the spelling Les Baricades Mistérieuses ["single r" in the first word, and "i" rather than "y" in the second word]. All four possible spelling combinations have since been used with "double r" and a "y" being the most common. The intended meaning of the phrase has remained an enigma (an example of how musical allusions can remain hidden over time).

There has been much speculation on the meaning of the phrase "mysterious barricades", but no direct evidence appears to be available. The harpsichordist Pascal Tufféry has suggested that, in keeping with the bucolic character of other pieces in Couperin's Ordre 6ème de clavecin, the pounding rhythm may represent the stamping of grapes in winemaking (given that the French word barrique means 'barrel', and barriquade was a designation adopted by viticulturalists of the day in France). In this view, the "mysterious" epithet could allude to the significance of wine in the Mysteries of Bacchus (as well as in the Eucharist). Some of the less likely interpretations of the "mysterious barricades" proposed over the years – sometimes in relation to the salonnières of the 17th century - include women’s eyelashes, underwear and even chastity belts.

A plausible attempt to link the title to features of the music itself has been provided by the harpsichordist Luke Arnason:

While the title reflects the musical structure, there may be more at play. The suggestion of barricades is "a double entendre referring simultaneously to feminine virginity and the suspensions [of] harmonic [progressions] of the music, [whose] lute figurations [from the style brisé] are imitated to produce an enigmatic stalemate", as Judith Robison Kipnis explained the work's title and its  interpretation by her husband Igor Kipnis.

Other suggested intended meanings for the title include:
 impeding communication between people
 between past and present or present and future
 between life and death
 masks worn by performers of Le Mystère ou les Fêtes de l'Inconnu (The Mysterious One or the Celebrations of the Unknown One) staged by one of Couperin's patrons, the Duchesse du Maine in 1714
 a "technical joke...the continuous suspensions in the lute style being a barricade to the basic harmony".

Legacy
Claude Debussy, who considered François Couperin to be the "most poetic of our [French] harpsichordists" and an influence on his own piano études, expressed particular admiration for Les Barricades Mystérieuses. In 1903, Debussy wrote:

Homages and references in other works
The piece has been used as a source of inspiration across different artistic fields including music, visual arts and literature.

Music
 1971 Moog synthesizer rendition titled Variations on Couperin's Rondeau ("Les Barricades mystérieuses") on the album "Short Circuits" by Ruth White.
 1973 harpsichord piece titled Barricades (Rock piece after Couperin). on the album "Bhajebochstiannanas" [an anagram of Johann Sebastian Bach] by Anthony Newman.
 1982 piece for Synclavier, "Las Barricadas Misteriosas" composed by Sergio Barroso.
 1984 written for, and incorporating texts by Christopher Hewitt, a piece for women's chorus, piccolo, bassoon, harpsichord and clapping titled "Les Barricades Mysteriéuses" by Juilliard composer Andrew Thomas.
 1986 album titled Heavenly Bodies including the "Appia Suite", one movement of which is titled "Les Barricades mystérieuses", by British Jazz composer Barbara Thompson. Rerecorded in the same year to be the title track of the German film Zischke.
 1987 piece for solo guitar by John Williams on his album "The Baroque Album"
 1988 rock piece titled "Mysterious Barricades" on the album of the same name by former Police guitarist Andy Summers.
 1989 work for flute and orchestra called "Les Barricades Mystérieuses" by Luca Francesconi.
 1989 piece for three recorders called "Les Barricades" by Matthias Maute.
 1990 a harpsichord concerto titled "Mysterious Barricades" commissioned by the Cleveland Chamber Symphony composed by Tyler White.
 1994 quintet arrangement for clarinet, bass clarinet, viola, cello and double bass in the album "America: A prophecy" by Thomas Adès.
 1994 piece for solo guitar titled "Mysterious Habitats" by Serbian guitarist Dusan Bogdanovic.
 1995 sextet arrangement for flute, oboe, clarinet, violin, viola, and cello titled "Les Barricades mystérieuses", the fourth of nine movements that make up the composition Récréations françaises by  French composer Gérard Pesson.
 1995 Le Barricate Misteriose (Hommage à Couperin) for 12 cellos, composed by Italian composer Gabriella Zen (commissioned by the Orquestra Villa Lobos).
 Mid-1990s solo percussion and electronic piece titled Mysterious Barricades on the album of the same name by Scott Smallwood.
 1997 commissioned by the San Antonio Symphony Orchestra, "Las Barricadas Misteriosas" is the third movement of ``Sinfonía à la Mariachi by Robert Xavier Rodriguez.
 1999 "Les Baricades Fantasques" is the second movement of a suite of three harpsichord pieces paying homage to Scarlatti, Couperin, and Bach, by American composer Robert T. Kelley.
 2001 "Girándula" for 4 corni di bassetto or 4 bass clarinets, based on "Les Barricades mystérieuses", by Jacobo Durán-Loriga.
 2002 folk song "Mysterious Barricades" on the album Letter to the Editor by Max Ochs.
 2003 piece for drums, voice and instruments titled "Through the Mysterious Barricade" by Philip Corner. This was revisited in 2011 with a new work titled ""Petite fantasie sur Les Barricades Mystérieuses (déjà une révélation) d'après François Couperin."
 2007 "decomposition and performance" for piano titled "Les Barricades" Canadian performance artist Yawen Wang.
 2009 electronic piece titled "Les Barricades Mystérieuses" by Portuguese composer António Ferreira.
 2009 music video "Les Barricades Mystérieuses" by French electro-acoustic artist Mulinex.
 2010 piece for oboe, horn, violin, viola, cello and harpsichord titled "The Mysterious Barricades" by Korean composer Jung Sun Kang.
 2019 song “Bambina” off the album “Father of the Bride” by Vampire Weekend bearing resemblance to the piece.
 2021 The composer Alma Deutscher suggested that her vocal and visual arrangement of the piece, where the notes in the different voices rest on one another like barrels, may explain the imagery of barricades.

Visual arts
 

Film
2006: featured in Sofia Coppola's [[Marie Antoinette (2006 film)|Marie Antoinette]]..
2011: featured prominently in Terrence Malick's film Tree of Life.
2015: featured in the French movie Nous trois ou rien.

Literature
  

 1922: The Worm Ourobouros. ER. Eddison. Early in this fantasy novel the protagonist and his wife, hearing their daughter play this piece, comment to each other that only they know the true meaning of the title. 
 1955: the short story The Mysterious Barricades by Joan Aiken in her collection More than You Bargained For
 2002: featured in the thriller novel Imprimatur by Rita Monaldi and Francesco Sorti, as the cure for an artificial pestilence.

References

External links
 Simon J. Evnine, University of Miami, Les Barricades Mystérieuses. A comprehensive listing of references in other works including recordings.

Compositions by François Couperin
Compositions for harpsichord
1717 compositions
Compositions in B-flat major